As a communications protocol the Aggregate Server Access Protocol is used by the Reliable server pooling (RSerPool) framework for the communication between
 Pool Elements and Pool Registrars (Application Layer)
 Pool Users and Pool Registrars (Application Layer)
 Pool Users and Pool Elements (Session Layer)

Standards Documents 
 Aggregate Server Access Protocol (ASAP)
 Aggregate Server Access Protocol (ASAP) and Endpoint Handlespace Redundancy Protocol (ENRP) Parameters
 Threats Introduced by Reliable Server Pooling (RSerPool) and Requirements for Security in Response to Threats
 Reliable Server Pooling Policies

External links 
 Thomas Dreibholz's Reliable Server Pooling (RSerPool) Page
 IETF RSerPool Working Group

Internet protocols
Internet Standards
Session layer protocols